Achryson foersteri is a species of longhorn beetle in the Cerambycinae subfamily. It was described by Bosq in 1953. It is known from  southern Brazil, Paraguay, Uruguay, and Argentina.

References

Achrysonini
Beetles described in 1953